Joy Picus (born 1930) is an American politician who served as a Los Angeles, California, City Council member for 16 years, from 1977 to 1993, and was a Ms. magazine "Woman of the Year" in 1985.

Biography

Picus is a native of Chicago, Illinois, where her father died shortly after she was born. As a youngster she helped her mother manage an apartment building, and at age sixteen she began her  political science studies at the University of Wisconsin. She and Gerald Picus, a physicist, were married in Chicago; they lived in Washington, D.C., for a time, then moved to California when Gerald took a job at Hughes Aircraft in 1959. They had three children.

They lived in Woodland Hills in the San Fernando Valley,  where Joy Picus became active in the Parent-Teacher Association and League of Women Voters and was also president of the Valley branch of the American Association of University Women. She was also employed for three years as community relations director for the Jewish Federation Council. She was a founding member of Temple Aliyah.

She became a feminist when she read Betty Friedan's book The Feminine Mystique in 1964. "That was my awakening," she said. Before I didn't know who Susan B. Anthony was." When she became a councilwoman she sponsored a Susan B. Anthony essay contest each year. Before that, she sponsored a "Great Expectations" program for high school girls, to help them expand their goals.

After her City Council defeat in 1993, she worked on behalf of "family-friendly" workplaces, women's rights and recycling. In 2006 she was chair of FOTO, the Friends of the [Griffith] Observatory.

City Council

Elections
A "Democrat of liberal bent," Picus began her political career in 1973 by challenging the incumbent councilman, Donald D. Lorenzen, in Los Angeles City Council District 3. Lorenzen won in a tight election that demanded a recount; the vote was 27,575 for Lorenzen and 27,027 for Picus. The latter, however, took on  Lorenzen again in 1977, and she won by 19,598 to 14,456. Picus said that voters turned against Lorenzen because of the way that the councilman had forced streetlights—and the resulting taxes—upon certain residential districts that did not want them. Lorenzen had referred to her as a "wild-eyed environmentalist.

She thus became the first woman to represent the San Fernando Valley on the Los Angeles City Council. In that era (1965) the 3rd District covered the southwest corner of the Valley, including Woodland Hills, Tarzana and parts of Encino, Canoga Park and Reseda. About the district, the Los Angeles Times wrote in 1981:

Although the district is largely white and middle class, it is complicated and anything but homogenous. A study in contrasts, it has expensive ranch homes in Woodland Hills that are minutes away from shack-like dwellings in Canoga Park, a largely Hispanic barrio dating from the early 1900s.

She was targeted for recall in 1979, a movement that failed for lack of signatures, and she was opposed by the city's police and firefighters unions, which considered her "anti-labor."

In the 1985 and 1989 elections, Picus was unsuccessfully challenged by Jeanne Nemo, "a Republican activist from Reseda" who was supported by Supervisor Michael Antonovich. Picus recalled that "My opponents were sending partisan mailings to registered Republicans, so I did my own mailing, signed by Maureen Reagan, who's been a friend since we campaigned for the Equal Rights Amendment." The vote in 1989 was close, however, with Picus barely avoiding a runoff, with only a 51.5% majority.

Picus's 16-year incumbency ended in 1993 with her loss to Laura Chick by 17 percentage points. With new term limits in place, though, Picus was assured that nobody would ever beat the length of her term in the 3rd District.

Highlights
 In the first year of her service, Picus was said to have "naively" slashed into "City Hall's flock of sacred cows, for example trying to delete funding for the Watts Parade and the Police Band from the city budget. Later, though, she was successful in ending the city practice of "paying for city employees attending veterans conventions on city time, the full-time salaries of seven police and fire union lobbyists at City Hall and performances of the Police Band and motorcycle drill team on city time."
 Picus became a "hero of local conservationists" for her pushing builders to get more open space for parks, her support for transportation projects and her drive to address waste recycling. She also opposed oil drilling in the Pacific Palisades.
 She was active in developing policies and programs on behalf of working parents and their children. She authored the city's Child Care Policy, "which made Los Angeles one of the first cities in the country to hire a full-time child-care coordinator." She also drove the opening of a child-care center for Civic Center employees in Downtown Los Angeles, financed by the city and federal governments. In 1989 she persuaded the City Council to create preferences in city contracts for companies that offered child-care benefits to their employees.
 Picus was critical of Police Chief Daryl Gates because, she said, she did not believe he told the truth when he denied knowing that a member of the Police Department's Intelligence Division "was taking files out of Parker Center and using them for political purposes." She supported a plan to make department heads—including the chief—"subject to review and possible removal at periodic intervals."
 The councilwoman pushed  for a successful 1978 ballot measure that limited veterans' advantage points on Civil Service tests because the practice discriminated against women and non-veterans.
 According to a Los Angeles Times interviewer, Picus was dubbed by some as a "Mary Poppins," from the " 'flighty impression' she sometimes conveys." She replied that her "preparation for political life came from activities primarily with other women," and so she was not "taken as seriously" as men. She emerged, the reporter wrote, "as a woman of enormous ego and drive, with tremendous energy and determination."
 Along with two other council members and the city itself, she was sued by the developers of a proposed office complex on Warner Ridge in Woodland Hills for their efforts in attempting to block the development. The developers won, but "unrelated factors led them to abandon the project."
 A Picus proposal to set up four independent planning commissions to make decisions in different parts of the city was rejected 10-3 by the City Council.

Ms. magazine
Picus was named a "Woman of the Year" by Ms. magazine in 1985 as a result of her successful drive to include an historic "pay equity" plan in the city's collective bargaining agreement with the American Federation of State, County and Municipal Employees. Also known as "comparable worth," the effort refers to upgrading pay rates for jobs that were paid lower wages because they had traditionally  been held by women. The magazine credited Picus with "helping bring about a $12-million pay equity agreement between the City of Los Angeles and 3,900 of its employees, most of them women."

Legacy
In 1996 the City Hall South Child Care Center was renamed the  Joy Picus Learning Center in her honor.

The Joy Picus Archives covering her years as a Los Angeles City Councilwoman are held at the University Library at California State University, Northridge.

References

Living people
1930 births
American feminists
Jewish American people in California politics
Los Angeles City Council members
People from Woodland Hills, Los Angeles
University of Wisconsin–Madison College of Letters and Science alumni
Women city councillors in California
Jewish women politicians
21st-century American Jews
21st-century American women